Dayton is a city in Liberty County, Texas, United States. The population was 8,777 at the 2020 census.

Geography

Demographics

As of the 2020 United States census, there were 8,777 people, 2,892 households, and 2,115 families residing in the city.

As of the census of 2000, there were 5,709 people, 2,129 households, and 1,517 families residing in the city. The population density was 517.1 people per square mile (199.7/km2). There were 2,371 housing units at an average density of 214.8 per square mile (82.9/km2). The racial makeup of the city was 71.08% White, 19.69% African American, 0.44% Native American, 0.68% Asian, 0.04% Pacific Islander, 6.67% from other races, and 1.40% from two or more races. Hispanic or Latino of any race were 10.53% of the population.

There were 2,129 households, out of which 37.4% had children under the age of 18 living with them, 50.5% were married couples living together, 16.4% had a female householder with no husband present, and 28.7% were non-families. 25.2% of all households were made up of individuals, and 12.1% had someone living alone who was 65 years of age or older. The average household size was 2.66 and the average family size was 3.18.

In the city, the population was spread out, with 30.0% under the age of 18, 9.7% from 18 to 24, 28.2% from 25 to 44, 20.2% from 45 to 64, and 12.0% who were 65 years of age or older. The median age was 33 years. For every 100 females, there were 89.3 males. For every 100 females age 18 and over, there were 87.4 males.

The median income for a household in the city was $52,179, and the median income for a family was $47,250. Males had a median income of $39,075 versus $21,068 for females. The per capita income for the city was $29,123. About 16.3% of families and 21.3% of the population were below the poverty line, including 33.6% of those under age 18 and 15.8% of those age 65 or over.

History

Dayton was historically also called West Liberty, Day's Town, Days Station, and Dayton Station. It was founded in 1831 as West Liberty, situated 3 miles west of the Trinity River with Liberty on the east bank. It had a West Liberty post office 1839–1841 and a Dayton post office starting in 1877. Dayton was originally a part of the City of Liberty, but voters petitioned and voted to separate from the City of Liberty in 1898. Dayton incorporated in May 1911. A fire that devoured the center of town in late August 1911 was followed a few days later by a vote to disincorporate. Dayton voted to reincorporated on 28 November 1925.

Notable people

 Aaron Ripkowski, football player
 Bill Daniel, governor of the United States Territory of Guam
 Don Brown, football player
 Julie Kocurek, attorney and judge
 John Otto (politician), American politician
 Marion Price Daniel, Sr., Texas governor
 Mike Mabry, American football center

Government and infrastructure
The Texas Department of Criminal Justice (TDCJ) operates the Dayton District Parole Office in Dayton. In addition, the TDCJ operates some correctional facilities near the City limits of Dayton.

The United States Postal Service operates the Dayton Post Office.

The District 18 seat in the Texas House of Representatives is currently held by republican Ernest Bailes.

The city of Dayton operates under a typical council–manager government with five elected members, and a mayor elected at-large. All six are non-partisan and unpaid, elected for two year terms, staggered so three positions are up for election each year. The current mayor is Caroline Wadzeck elected in 2019 and re-elected in 2021. Her current term will expire in 2023. Executive power is vested in the council-appointed city manager, currently Interim City Manager David Willard. City Administration also includes a Deputy City Manager, and an Assistant City Manager.

The Dayton Community Development Corporation (DCDC), a type B Economic Development entity, provides economic development and community development services to the greater Dayton, Texas region. DCDC has invested over $3 Million in the local business community since its creation in 1996.

Transportation

Highways

The major route passing through Dayton is U.S. Highway 90, traveling west towards Crosby and Houston and east into East Texas to Beaumont and onward to Louisiana.

SH 321 connects Dayton to Cleveland. Within the city of Dayton, SH 321 is referred to as North Cleveland Street, passing through residential Dayton as a four-lane urban highway, before narrowing back down to a two-lane rural State Highway going north to Cleveland.

SH 146 provides Dayton with a connection to Baytown.

FM 1960 connects Dayton to the northern reaches of Houston as well as Humble and Huffman. FM 1409 connects Dayton to Old River-Winfree.

Texas State Highway 99 loop toll road intersects with US 90 and connects Dayton with other outer areas of Greater Houston.

Railroads

Dayton is the meeting point of two rail lines. One is a north/south Union Pacific (UP) line that comes out of the UP Baytown Subdivision.  The other is the east/west UP Lafayette Subdivision line that roughly follows US 90. The BNSF has authority to operate its trains on the Baytown Subdivision from Dayton to just west of Baytown and has a rail yard just south of Dayton. Another rail line runs through the northern edge of the city, called the UP Beaumont Subdivision.  A study was performed by the Texas Department of Transportation concerning a Dayton-to-Cleveland single mainline rail corridor consisting of approximately 40 miles of track connecting the UP Lufkin Subdivision and the BNSF Conroe Subdivision near Cleveland to the UPRR Baytown Subdivision south of Dayton.

Education
The city of Dayton is served by the Dayton Independent School District.

Dayton ISD students are zoned to Lee College.

The community is served by the Jones Public Library. The Jones Library Board is an advisory board appointed by the Dayton City Council.

Climate
The climate in this area is characterized by hot, humid summers and generally mild to cool winters.  According to the Köppen Climate Classification system, Dayton has a humid subtropical climate, abbreviated "Cfa" on climate maps.

References

External links

 www.dayton-online.com – Dayton's Online Community.

Cities in Texas
Cities in Liberty County, Texas
Greater Houston
Populated places established in 1911